The Lokmanya Nagar railway station (station code: LKMN), is one of the local railway stations in Indore City.

Station on the Delhi–Hyderabad metre-gauge line was founded in the 1970s. The station is equipped with one reservation counter. It is a broad-gauge railway station.

Major trains
The following trains have stoppage at the station.

Suburban trains

The Indore Suburban Railway is a commuter rail system serving the Indore Metropolitan Region. It is operated by Indian Railways' zonal Western Railways (WR). It has the highest passenger density of any urban railway system in Madhya Pradesh. The trains plying on its routes are commonly referred to as local trains or simply as locals.

References

Railway stations in Indore
Ratlam railway division
Memorials to Bal Gangadhar Tilak
Railway stations opened in the 1970s